Theodor Peckolt (1822–1912) was a German-born naturalist, botanist, phytochemist and pharmacist who worked in Brazil from 1847 to 1912, analyzing the chemical and medicinal properties of Brazilian flora.

References

External links
 Uma aventura científica no Brasil: Theodoro Peckolt. Por Nadja Paraense dos Santos. Revista Comciência, (In Portuguese).

1822 births
1912 deaths
Brazilian scientists
German naturalists
Brazilian people of German descent